Charles William Post (October 26, 1854 – May 9, 1914) was an American innovator, breakfast cereal and foods manufacturer and a pioneer in the prepared-food industry. He was the founder of what is now Post Consumer Brands.

Early life
Charles William Post, commonly known as "C. W.", was born October 26, 1854, in Springfield, Illinois. He was the son of Charles Rollin Post and Caroline Lathrop Post, and grew up in the adopted hometown of Abraham Lincoln, President of the United States during Post's boyhood years.

Post graduated from the public schools of Springfield and enrolled at Illinois Industrial University (known today as the University of Illinois at Urbana–Champaign), where he remained two years before leaving without a degree.

After a brief stay in Independence, Kansas, Post returned to Springfield, where he remained for over a decade working as a salesman and manufacturer of agricultural machinery. During this interval Post invented and patented several farm implements, including a plow, a harrow, and a hay-stacking machine.

In November 1874, Post married Ella Letitia Merriweather; they had one daughter, Marjorie. Ella supported her husband throughout his career and cared for him when he was ill. As Post became wealthier and began spending more time away from Ella, who was often ill, he slowly drifted away from her. Against her wishes, Post separated from her in 1904 and married his second wife, Leila Young, his 27-year-old secretary, in November 1904. Marjorie, who remained close to her father, later said that her mother died of "a broken heart" after Post divorced her and married his secretary. In a deceitful  attempt to have his daughter become closer with his secretary (soon to be wife), C.W. hired her to be a travel companion for Marjorie. When Marjorie realized the ruse, she deeply resented Leila.

Career

Post suffered a mental breakdown in November 1885, the result of the stress and overwork which accompanied his job as a farm implement manufacturer. Post made a break with his previous life, moving to Texas in 1886, where he came into association with a group of real estate developers in Fort Worth, who were attempting to establish a new community on the eastern outskirts of a town called Riverside. In 1888, Post began a real estate development of his own in Fort Worth on  that he had obtained, platting the land for streets and homes and constructing two mills.

The stress of this work again proved too much for Post's constitution, and a second breakdown followed in 1891. Post began a period of extensive travels in search of a cure, coming to take particular interest in the chemistry of digestion. After a period traversing Europe, Post visited the Battle Creek Sanitarium of Battle Creek, Michigan, a facility operated by John Harvey Kellogg (brother of Kellogg Company founder Will Keith Kellogg). Post has been accused of stealing several of Kellogg's recipes, including Kellogg's Caramel Coffee Cereal (Post's Postum), Cornflakes (Toasties), and Malted Nuts (Grape Nuts).

In 1895, Post founded Postum Cereal Co., with his first product, Postum cereal beverage.  Post's first breakfast cereal premiered in 1897, and he named the product Grape-Nuts cereal because of the fruity aroma noticed during the manufacturing process and the nutty crunch of the finished product. In 1904, he followed up the Grape Nuts label with a brand of corn flakes, which was first called Elijah's Manna before being renamed Post Toasties in 1908. The British government refused to allow Post to market his cereal in the United Kingdom using the name Elijah's Manna, stating that it was sacrilegious.

In 1906, Post invested some of his substantial earnings from his food products manufacturing into Texas real estate, purchasing a massive  tract in Garza and Lynn Counties. Post platted a new town, which he called Post City. Shade trees were planted, farm parcels laid out, and a hotel, school, churches, and a department store were constructed for the new Garza County seat.

In 1907, Collier's Weekly published an article questioning the claim made in advertisements for Grape Nuts that it could cure appendicitis. Post responded with advertisements questioning the mental capacity of the article's author, and Collier's Weekly sued for libel. The case was heard in 1910, and Post was fined $50,000. The decision was overturned on appeal, but advertisements for Postum products stopped making such claims.

Post was a staunch opponent of the trade union movement and was remembered by the National Association of Manufacturers as one who "opposed bitterly boycotts, strikes, lockouts, picketing and other forms of coercion in the relations between employer and employee." Post was also a leading public advocate of the open shop system.  However, as compensation, Post paid the highest wages, and provided bonuses and benefits. Near Battle Creek, he had model homes built that were sold to employees under certain conditions.

Death and legacy

At the end of 1913, the chronically ill Post's health deteriorated to the point that he canceled public appearances. In early March 1914, Post was believed to be suffering from appendicitis and was rushed via a nonstop train from California to Rochester, Minnesota, to be operated on by Drs. William and Charles Mayo, regarded as the preeminent surgeons of the day. Mayo brothers operated (successfully) sometime between March 5 and 10, 1914, without any relief from the life long abdominal pains, according to the book American Empress: The Life and Times of Marjorie Merriweather Post. The breakfast cereal magnate returned home to Santa Barbara. Even with surgical remedy, he was still plagued by stomach pain.
On May 9, 1914, despondent over his ongoing stomach illness, Post died by suicide with a self-inflicted gunshot. He was 59 years old. His 27-year-old daughter, Marjorie Merriweather Post, inherited his company along with most of his vast fortune, one of the largest of the early 20th century.

Marjorie Merriweather Post later married financier E. F. Hutton and owned a  estate on Long Island's North Shore called "Hillwood." Marjorie sold the estate in 1951 for $200,000 to Long Island University, which founded its residential C.W. Post College in 1954, marking the 100th anniversary of C.W. Post's birth. For a while named the C.W. Post Center and then the C.W. Post Campus, what was C.W. Post College has now become mainly a commuter campus called LIU/Post, and it has about 8,500 full- and part-time students and over 100,000 alumni.

The World War II Liberty Ship  was named in his honor.

See also
Close City, Texas
Post Foods
Garza County Historical Museum
General Foods
C. W. Post Memorial Camp

References

Further reading
 Charles Dudley Eaves and Cecil Allen Hutchinson, Post City, Texas: C.W. Post's Colonizing Activities in West Texas. Austin: Texas State Historical Association, 1952.
 Nettie Letich Major, C.W. Post: The Hour and the Man: A Biography with Genealogical Supplement. Washington: Judd and Detweiler, 1963.
 Jan Reid, "C.W. Post," Texas Monthly, March 1987.

External links

 History of C.W. Post (company site) 
 Another biography of C.W. (Charles William) Post
Records of Post land colonization company in the Southwest Collection/Special Collections Library at Texas Tech University See also other Double U Ranch records.
Blueprints of structures at Post, Texas, 1908–1915, in the Southwest Collection/Special Collections Library at Texas Tech University

Finding Aid for the Post Family Papers, 1882-1973, Bentley Historical Library, University of Michigan
 >
 Biography of daughter Marjorie Merriweather Post  Kenneth Lisenbee containing biographical information about C.W. Post.

1854 births
1914 deaths
American food company founders
American nutritionists
People from Battle Creek, Michigan
Suicides by firearm in California
People from Springfield, Illinois
Businesspeople from Illinois
19th-century American businesspeople
1914 suicides
Post Holdings
General Foods